The second and final season of La querida del Centauro, an American drama, was created by Lina Uribe and Darío Vanegas and developed by Telemundo. It premiered on May 2, 2017 and ended on July 24, 2017. The new season revolves around the revenge that will carry out El Centauro (Humberto Zurita). Prisoner of an obsession that knows no limits, the capo deploys all its evil to punish his old lover, Yolanda (Ludwika Paleta), and Gerardo (Michel Brown), the detective who tried to bring him to justice.

This second season does not have the participation of Irene Azuela and Alexandra de la Mora. Returning cast members from previous seasons include: Humberto Zurita, Ludwika Paleta and Michel Brown. New additions to the cast are Sandra Echeverría.

Plot 
The second season tells the story of the Centauro revenge against Yolanda, his former lover and Gerardo, the detective who sought to bring him to justice. After running away from the authorities for two years, tired of being constantly harassed by the police and the bloody war between his cartel and his rivals, Centauro will fake his death and that of his son. In this way he will be able to rebuild his empire without the persecution of the police and, moreover, will allow him to execute his plan of revenge. Listening to the news of the alleged deaths, Yolanda and her daughter Cristina, as well as Gerardo and his adopted son, Gato, manage to return to Mexico from Canada, where they have lived under the Witness Protection Program. However, it will not be an easy return for Yolanda, since Centaurus will use all his sagacity and power to destroy her and her loved ones in their thirst for revenge.

Cast

Starring 
 Humberto Zurita as Benedictino Suárez / El Centauro
 Ludwika Paleta as Yolanda Acosta
 Michel Brown as Gerardo Duarte
 Sandra Echeverría as Ana Velazco

Also starring 
 Ricardo Polanco as Rafael Bianchini
 Mónica Dionne as Leticia Solís
 Michel Chauvet as Emilio Cobos
 Arantza Ruiz as Cristina Acosta
 Pablo Abitia as Vicente Garrido
 Salvador Amaya as Isidro Gómez
 Horacio García Rojas as Eduardo Lalo López
 Tizoc Arroyo as Javier Antuna
 Alejandro Caso as Julián Lemus
 Óscar Toledano as Nicolás Bayón
 Jaime del Aguila as Luis "Lucho" Rodríguez
 Iñaki Godoy as Amadeo / El Gato
 Raúl Villegas as Miguel Fernández
 José Ramón Berganza as Román Luna

Recurring 
 Albi De Abreu as El Loco
 Quetzalli Bulnes as Adriana Bianchini
 Mariannela Cataño as Paula Bianchini
 Diego Cornejo as Tyson

Episodes

References 

2017 American television seasons
2017 Mexican television seasons